The moustached tinkerbird (Pogoniulus leucomystax) is a species of bird in the Lybiidae family (African barbets).
It is found in Kenya, Malawi, Tanzania, Uganda, and Zambia.

References

moustached tinkerbird
Birds of East Africa
moustached tinkerbird
Taxonomy articles created by Polbot